Arthur Reginald Allen (3 May 1919 – 3 April 1976) was an English footballer who played as a goalkeeper for Queens Park Rangers and Manchester United in the 1930s, 1940s and 1950s.

Career
Allen made his QPR first team debut in an FA Cup tie at Crystal Palace on 26 November 1938. his league debut against Newport County took place a week later on 3 December 1938. Allen was known as one of the best goalkeepers of his era. He initially played for the Corona Football Club in the Hanwell and District League where a QPR supporter spotted him and recommended him to the club. He was given a trial with the reserve team at Clacton and the side lost 2–1. Allen felt he had played poorly. The club though felt he had promise but it was several months before he could be persuaded to play again. His next match was again with the reserves at West Ham on 12 March 1937. West Ham won 7–1. Despite this it was still felt that Allen had done well and on 6 May 1938 he signed professional terms. Allen went on to play 183 league games for QPR, his career impacted by the war years where he was a prisoner of war (POW) in North Africa after being captured while on a commando raid in July 1941. While in German hands, Allen played in many six-a-side games, typically as centre-forward to help gain a different insight to the game. He was a member of the 1948 QPR team that won the Third Division (South) championship.

Allen was transferred to Manchester United on 6 June 1950 for £11,000, a then world-record fee for a goalkeeper. With his signing, Jack Crompton, then the first-choice keeper at United, was reduced to a back-up role. Allen played his last game for Manchester United on 4 October 1952, when Crompton managed to reclaim the number 1 jersey, along with promising, young 'keeper Ray Wood. Allen retired from football within five years. A testimonial game for Allen took place between QPR and Manchester United on 29 March 1954, raising in the region of £1,800 for his testimonial fund.

He died on 3 April 1976, one month before what would have been his 57th birthday.

Honours

Club
Queens Park Rangers
Third Division (South): 1947–48
Manchester United
First Division: 1951–52

1919 births
1976 deaths
Footballers from Marylebone
English footballers
Association football goalkeepers
Manchester United F.C. players
Queens Park Rangers F.C. players
English Football League players
English Football League representative players
British Army personnel of World War II
British Army Commandos soldiers
British World War II prisoners of war
World War II prisoners of war held by Germany
Military personnel from London